Matheus Nascimento may refer to:
 Matheus (footballer, born 1983), Brazilian footballer
 Matheus Nascimento (footballer, born 2004), Brazilian footballer